Moutai Institute, formerly known as Moutai University, is a private alcohol-centered higher education institution in Renhuai, Guizhou, Southwest China. 

The institute is established by Kweichow Moutai Group, the parent company of Kweichow Moutai, the producer of Moutai, known as the "national liquor" of China. The establishment of the institute aims at addressing the lack of technical skills and talent in the liquor industry of China. The preparatory work to establish Moutai Institute began in 2012, and approved by the Ministry of Education of China in May 2017.

There are five majors in the institute – including distilling, wine-making, food quality and safety, resource recycling science and engineering, and marketing. The campus of the institute covers an area of 72 hectares. Some instructors are senior professionals from Moutai Group. The first class was enrolled from the natives of Guizhou in 2017.

References

External links
Official website 

Universities and colleges in Guizhou
Education in Guizhou
2017 establishments in China
Educational institutions established in 2017